Enrique Omar Aguirre (born December 6, 1979) is a retired male decathlete from Argentina who competed for his native country at the 2003 Pan American Games in Santo Domingo, Dominican Republic. He set his personal best score (7703 points) in Huelva on August 7, 2004. He is a two-time national champion in the men's decathlon (2002 and 2004).

Achievements

References 

1979 births
Living people
Argentine decathletes
Athletes (track and field) at the 2003 Pan American Games
Pan American Games competitors for Argentina